Unrequited may refer to:

 Unrequited (album), an album by Loudon Wainwright III
 "Unrequited" (Law & Order: Criminal Intent episode), an episode of the TV series Law & Order: Criminal Intent
 "Unrequited" (The X-Files), an episode of the TV series The X-Files
 Unrequited (film), a 2010 film starring Michael Welch and David Keith

See also 
 Unrequited love